Chüy Prospekti, is a major avenue in Bishkek, Kyrgyzstan. It stretches from east border of Bishkek to Deng Xiaoping Prospekti in the west.

History
Chüy Prospekti originated as Kupecheskaya (Merchant) Street, and in 1924 it was renamed into Grazhdanskaya (Civil) Street. From 1936 it was known as Stalin Street, 1961 - XXII Parts'ezd Street, and in 1974 as Lenin Prospekt. Before the October Revolution Serafim Church, Tatar Mosque with medrese together with merchant's small shops, timber houses, and clay-walled huts were located along the street. In 1920-s the church was adopted for a social club, and the mosque and the medrese were converted to a school. All those buildings did not survived to present days.

References

Buildings and structures in Bishkek
Streets in Kyrgyzstan
Transport in Bishkek